Ma-mong-a-ze-da (Ojibwe: Mamaangĕzide "[Have Very] Big Foot") was an 18th-century Ojibwa chief from Shagawamikong.  He was a member of the Caribou doodem "Adik Reindeer Clan" and his ancestors came from Grand Portage on the north shore of Lake Superior.  His father was his mother's second husband as she had been married to a chief of the Dakota people previously during a period of peace between the Ojibwa and Dakota.  When war resumed the couple was obliged to divorce with the husband and children joining the Dakota and the wife marrying an Ojibwa man.  In this way, Mamongazeda's older half-brother Waḣpeša “Red Leaf” Atetaŋkawamduška “Great Father of Snakes” Delonais, Wapasha I Wapasha became a chief of the Dakota while he became a chief of the Ojibwa.  In addition to being an accomplished war leader, Mamongazeda was persuasive diplomat and strong ally of the French.  During the French and Indian War, Mamongazeda raised a party of Lake Superior Ojibwa to fight with the French, and were part of Montcalm's army at the Battle of the Plains of Abraham.  He lived to a very old age and was succeeded by his son, the famous chief and warrior, Waubojeeg.

Notes

References
 Schoolcraft, Henry R. (1847). Historical and Statistical Information concerning the History, Conditions and Prospects of the Indian Tribes of the United States. Vol. II 
 Warren, William W. (1851). History of the Ojibway People.
 Brazer, Marjorie Cahn (1993). Harps Upon the Willows: The Johnston Family of the Old Northwest.

Year of death missing
Native American leaders
Ojibwe people
Year of birth unknown
18th-century Native Americans